INTERPOL is the telegraphic address for the International Criminal Police Organization (ICPO), an intergovernmental organization.

Interpol may also refer to:
 Interpol (film), a 1957 crime film directed by John Gilling
 Interpol (video game), a video game developed by TikGames
 Interpol (band), a New York City post-punk revival band
 Interpol (album), the band's self-titled fourth studio album
 Interpol (EP), the band's third EP release
 Short for interpolation

See also